Anna of Bohemia and Hungary (23 July 1503 – 27 January 1547), sometimes known as Anna Jagellonica, was Queen of Germany, Bohemia, and Hungary and Archduchess of Austria as the wife of King Ferdinand I (later Holy Roman Emperor).

Early life

She was the oldest child and only daughter of King Vladislaus II of Bohemia and Hungary (1456–1516) and his third wife Anne of Foix-Candale. King Louis II of Hungary and Bohemia was her younger brother. Her paternal grandparents were King Casimir IV of Poland (of the Jagiellon dynasty) and Elisabeth of Austria, one of the heiresses of the Kingdom of Bohemia, the Duchy of Luxembourg and the Duchy of Kujavia. Her maternal grandparents were Gaston de Foix, Count of Candale, and Catherine de Foix, an Infanta of the Kingdom of Navarre.

Anne was born in Buda (now Budapest). The death of Vladislaus II on 13 March 1516 left both siblings in the care of the Holy Roman Emperor Maximilan I. It was arranged for Anna to marry his grandson, Archduke Ferdinand of Austria, second son of Queen Regnant Joanna of Castile and her late husband and co-ruler, Philip I of Castile. Anna and Mary moved first to Vienna, and then to Innsbruck. Maximilian rarely visited, but he sent his hunter home to instruct the two girls in the art of hunting. There was emphasis on their abilities to handle weapons and other physical skills. The Humanist education they enjoyed focused on problem-solving skills. They were also instructed in dancing, music, and came in contact with many humanists visited the imperial library there. Innsbruck was also home to a great weapon arsenal and a growing armament industry built by the emperor.
Anna married Ferdinand on 26 May 1521 in Linz, Austria. At the time, Ferdinand was governing the Habsburg hereditary lands on behalf of his older brother Charles V, Holy Roman Emperor. It was stipulated that Ferdinand should succeed Anne's brother Louis in case he died without legitimate male heirs.

Queen of Bohemia and Hungary

Louis died without a legitimate male heir after he was thrown from his horse at the conclusion of the Battle of Mohács against Suleiman the Magnificent of the Ottoman Empire on 29 August 1526. This left the thrones of both Bohemia and Hungary vacant. Ferdinand claimed both kingdoms and was elected King of Bohemia on 24 October of the same year with Anne as his Queen.

Hungary was a more difficult case. Suleiman had annexed much of its lands. Ferdinand was proclaimed King of Hungary by a group of nobles, but another faction of Hungarian nobles refused to allow a foreign ruler to hold that title and elected John Zápolya as an alternative king. The resulting conflict between the two rivals and their successors lasted until 1570 when John's son John Sigismund gave up the title King of Hungary in favor of Ferdinand's son Maximilian as part of the terms of the Treaty of Speyer. In 1531, Ferdinand's older brother Charles V recognized Ferdinand as his successor as Holy Roman Emperor, and Ferdinand was elevated to the title King of the Romans.

Anne was trusted by her husband with many great responsibilities. During his stay in Brussels, she was appointed as Regent (Statthalterin). Together with the Bishop of Trieste, she was the Chair of his Hofrat (Court Council). In her husband's name, she presided over many Diets. She became famous for her charity and wisdom.

Ferdinand at first seemed to suffer from a lack of premarital experience, but in the end the marriage proved extremely successful both personally and politically. Anna and Ferdinand had fifteen children, all of whom were born in Bohemia or Austria. The kingdoms of both Bohemia and Hungary had suffered for centuries from premature deaths among heirs and a shortage of succession prospects, a predicament resolved by Anne's impressive fertility. Meanwhile, Anna served as Queen Consort of Bohemia and as one of three living Queens of Hungary until her death. She died in Prague, days after giving birth to her last daughter Joanna. In 1556, Charles V abdicated and Ferdinand succeeded as emperor, nine years after Anna's death. After Anna died, Ferdinand was recommended to remarry several times by people around him, but he could not forget his wife and lived single.

Her husband expanded the Castle of Linz to offer her more security in times of war. The Belvedere ("Queen Anne's Summer Palace"), one of the most beautiful buildings in Prague, was built for her by her husband Ferdinand on the grounds of Prague Castle starting in 1538. It was not completed in its present form until 1565, long after her death.

Children

Ancestry

References

Sources

External links

|-

|-

|-

|-

1503 births
1547 deaths
16th-century German people
16th-century Hungarian nobility
16th-century Hungarian women
16th-century Italian nobility
Bohemian queens consort
Deaths in childbirth
German queens consort
Hungarian queens consort
Jagiellonian dynasty
Nobility from Prague
Burials at St. Vitus Cathedral
Daughters of kings